Sir John Fowke Lancelot Rolleston  (26 March 1848 – 9 April 1919) was a British Conservative Party politician.

Rolleston was the eldest son of Rev. William Lancelot Rolleston, vicar of Great Dalby and Scraptoft, and his wife, Mary Sophia Fowke, daughter of Sir Frederick Gustavus Fowke, 1st Baronet.

He was educated at Repton School and King's College London. He was the leader of the Conservatives in Leicester. Following two defeats at the polls, he was elected as a Member of Parliament for Leicester in 1900; the seat then having two MPs. He sat until 1906 when he was again defeated by the Liberal-Labour coalition. At the January 1910 general election, he became the Conservative Member of Parliament for Hertford and held the seat until 1916. He was knighted in 1897.

Rolleston was also a prominent freemason. After several years of declining health, he died at his home in Glen Parva, Leicestershire, at the age of 71.

References

External links 
 

1848 births
1919 deaths
People educated at Repton School
Alumni of King's College London
UK MPs 1900–1906
Conservative Party (UK) MPs for English constituencies
Deputy Lieutenants of Leicestershire
English justices of the peace
Knights Bachelor